Signe Giebelhausen (1811-1879) was a Norwegian (originally Danish) stage actress. She was active at the Christiania Offentlige Theater and the Christiania Theatre in Oslo in 1833-73. She was married to the actor Christian Giebelhausen.

Alongside Christian Jörgenseen, Peter Nielsen, Augusta Schrumpf and Emilie da Fonseca, she belonged to the acting elite in Norway in the first half of the 19th-century, when the Christiania Theatre was the only standing stage in Norway, and dominated by actors of Danish origin. She is most known for her successful roles as elder aristocratic ladies in burgher comedies.

References 
 Blanc, Tharald Høyerup: Christiania theaters historie 1827-1877, J.W. Cappelen Christiania

1811 births
1879 deaths
19th-century Norwegian actresses
Norwegian stage actresses